Charles Brownlow may refer to:

Chas Brownlow (1861–1924), Australian rules football administrator in the Victorian Football League
 Charles Brownlow, 1st Baron Lurgan (1795–1847), Irish politician who sat in the House of Commons from 1818 to 1832
 Charles Brownlow, 2nd Baron Lurgan (1831–1882), Anglo-Irish Liberal politician
 Charles Henry Brownlow (1831–1916), British Army officer
 Charles Brownlow (The Bill), fictional character